A103, A.103, A 103 or A-103 may refer to:
 A103 road (England), a road in London connecting Lower Holloway to Hornsey
 A 103 motorway (Germany) , a German autobahn
 AS-103, a 1965 spaceflight in the Apollo program
 Agusta A.103, a 1959 Italian prototype single-seat light helicopter
 RFA Bacchus (A103), a 1936 Royal Fleet Auxiliaryship stores freighter and distilling ship